Kafr Rumman is a Palestinian town in the Tulkarm Governorate in the eastern West Bank, located 11 kilometers East of Tulkarm. According to the Palestinian Central Bureau of Statistics, Kafr Rumman had a population of approximately 869 inhabitants in mid-year 2007.

History
Potsherd from the Middle Bronze Age IIB, Iron Age II,  Persian, Hellenistic, Roman, Byzantine and early Muslim eras have been found here.

Ottoman era 
Kafr Rumman, like all of Palestine was incorporated into the Ottoman Empire in 1517.  In the 1596  tax registers, it was part of the nahiya ("subdistrict") of Jabal Sami, part of the larger Sanjak of Nablus. It had a population of 20 households, all Muslims. The inhabitants paid a fixed tax rate of 33,3% on agricultural products, including wheat, barley, summer crops, olive trees,  goats and beehives, in addition to occasional revenues and a press for olive oil or grape syrup, and a fixed tax for people of Nablus area; a total of 3,022  akçe.

The old core of the village is presumed to have been built in the 16th-17th century CE, and contains high, fortified buildings.

In 1838 Kefr Rumman was placed  in the  Wady esh-Sha'ir administrative region, west of Nablus.

In 1870 Victor Guérin noted it from nearby Ramin.

In 1882 the PEF's Survey of Western Palestine (SWP)  described Kefr Rumman as: "a small hamlet on the side of the mountain, with a well to the north and olives."

British Mandate era
In the 1922 census of Palestine conducted  by the British Mandate authorities, Kufr Rumman had a population of 161 Muslims, increasing in the 1931 census to  189  Muslims, in 48 houses.

In the 1945 statistics  the population of Kafr Rumman was 270 Muslims,  with 3,933   dunams of land  according to an official land and population survey. Of this, 625 dunams were plantations and irrigable land, 352  were used for cereals, while 5 dunams were built-up (urban) land.

Jordanian era
In the wake of the 1948 Arab–Israeli War, and after the 1949 Armistice Agreements, Kafr Rumman came  under Jordanian rule.

In 1961, the population was  466.

Post 1967
Since the Six-Day War in 1967, Kafr Rumman  has been under Israeli occupation.

References

Bibliography

External links
 Welcome To Kafr Rumman
 Kafr Rumman, Welcome to Palestine
Survey of Western Palestine, Map 11:    IAA, Wikimedia commons 

Towns in the West Bank
Municipalities of the State of Palestine